Gibbosporina mascarena is a species of foliose lichen in the family Pannariaceae. It was described as a new species in 2016 by Arve Elvebakk, Soon Gyu Hong, and Per Magnus Jørgensen. The specific epithet mascarena ("from the Mascarenes") refers to Réunion and Mauritius.

References

mascarena
Lichen species
Lichens of Asia
Lichens of Mauritius
Lichens described in 2016
Taxa named by Per Magnus Jørgensen
Lichens of Réunion
Taxa named by Arve Elvebakk